Zaton may refer to:

 Zaton, Dubrovnik-Neretva County, Croatia
 Zaton, Šibenik-Knin County, Croatia
 Zaton, Zadar County, Croatia
 Zátoň, a village in Větřní, Český Krumlov District, Czech Republic
 Zátoň, a village in Lenora (Prachatice District), Czech Republic
 Zaton, Montenegro
 Zatoń Dolna, a village in Poland
 Zaton (lake), a karst lake in Ponoarele, Mehedinți County, Romania
 Zaton, Astrakhan Oblast, Russia
 Zaton, Perm Krai, Russia
 Zaton, Voronezh Oblast, Russia
 Zaton neighbourhood of the city of Ufa, Bashkortostan, Russia
 Zaton Bridge

See also